"Theef" is the fourteenth episode of the seventh season of the science fiction television series The X-Files. It premiered on the Fox network in the United States on March 12, 2000. It was written by Vince Gilligan, John Shiban, and Frank Spotnitz and directed by Kim Manners. The episode is a Monster-of-the-Week" story, unconnected to the series' wider mythology. "Theef" earned a Nielsen household rating of 7.4, being watched by 11.91 million people in its initial broadcast. The episode received mixed to positive reviews from critics.

The show centers on FBI special agents Fox Mulder (David Duchovny) and Dana Scully (Gillian Anderson) who work on cases linked to the paranormal, called X-Files. Mulder is a believer in the paranormal, while the skeptical Scully has been assigned to debunk his work. In this episode, Mulder and Scully investigate the murder of a prominent doctor's father-in-law, who was found with the word "theef" written on the wall in blood. After a string of follow-up accidents, Mulder suspects hexcraft may be the source of threats against the doctor's family.

"Theef" was written in a short amount of time during the show's Christmas break after another script was dropped by the series. The main concept of the episode was "modern medicine versus backyards supernatural arts". The episode featured several noted actors, including Billy Drago, who played the role of antagonist Orell Peattie, and James Morrison, who was a former cast member of the science fiction series Space: Above and Beyond, which was created by former X-Files writers Glen Morgan and James Wong. Series creator Chris Carter later called the episode "very well cast".

Plot

Dr. Irving Thalbro is staying the night with his daughter and her family in Marin County, California, including her husband Dr. Robert Wieder (James Morrison). In the middle of the night, Irving finds a pile of dirt shaped like a man in his bed. Irving is eventually discovered by Robert hanging from the ceiling with the word "theef" painted in Irving's blood on the wall.

While investigating the next morning, Fox Mulder (David Duchovny) notices the graveyard dirt in Irving's bed and believes it may be caused by a hoodoo hex. Dana Scully (Gillian Anderson), however, believes that the doctor committed suicide by slitting his own throat, writing on the wall, and hanging himself. After the autopsy, it is determined that Irving suffered from a prion disease called kuru, which has not been found in the United States before. Mulder believes that kuru was given to him by a hex that caused him to go mad. The Wieders then find a family photo missing from their bedroom, and a "hoodoo man", later revealed to be named Orell Peattie (Billy Drago), is seen placing the faces cut from the picture into various poppet dolls. Ms. Wieder collapses after another pile of graveyard dirt is found in her bed. Her skin then sprouts lesions as the "hoodoo man" stands by the pool talking to the poppet.

Peattie visits Dr. Wieder at work but refuses to tell him why he is committing these hexes against his family. Wieder does some research of his own and finds a bracelet in a Jane Doe file that he believes may be connected. Mulder consults an expert in the occult, who notes that, in order to commit hexes, the man must draw energy from a charm and place blood, hair, and a picture of the victim inside a poppet in order to follow through with the hexes. Meanwhile, Mrs. Wieder is burned to death during an MRI, and the "hoodoo man" is found taking her poppet out of a microwave. The word "theef" is also found branded in Mrs. Wieder's chest. Wieder tells the agents about the man who came to see him and the Jane Doe case. After investigating, it is revealed that Jane Doe was Lynnette Peattie, who had previously died in a bus crash. The doctor gave her an overdose of morphine, euthanizing her due to her pain. Mulder assumes the man is her father and that he feels the doctor stole his family away from him. Mulder decides to exhume Lynette's body and take away her father's power, but when they exhume the casket there is no body inside.

Meanwhile, Peattie's landlady  sneaks into his apartment for pain medication and finds Lynette's body in his bed. Immediately, she contracts a flesh-eating disease. After hearing about the incident on the news, Mulder goes to Peattie's apartment and finds the body, now headless. Peattie finds the Wieder family, whom Scully is protecting, and makes a poppet with Scully's hair and photo inside. He places nails in the doll's eyes and Scully promptly goes blind. Peattie breaks into the house, takes Scully's gun, and stabs a poppet of Wieder, causing the doctor to collapse in pain. Wieder gets Peattie to admit that he's taking out his own guilt about not being able to save Lynette by blaming him instead. Mulder shows up, finds Scully's doll, and removes the nails from it, allowing her to regain her vision and shoot Peattie. He is placed in a coma and Lynnette's body is shipped back to her home in West Virginia.

Production

Writing
The script for "Theef" was written by Frank Spotnitz, John Shiban, and Vince Gilligan during the production crew's Christmas break after a previous script was scrapped at the last minute. After mulling over options, the three decided to craft a story about "modern medicine versus backyards supernatural arts". Gilligan later joked that "I think I was enlisted for the fact that I'm Southern, and they thought I was the closest thing they had to a hillbilly on the staff".

Producer David Amann explained that the inspiration for the story was the question, "What if you have a doctor who is prosperous but has a dark page from his past that comes back to haunt him?" Spotnitz later elaborated that the story initially was "going to be how do you get rid of something you can't get rid of". However, the writers soon found this storyline difficult to develop, and, by Spotnitz's own admission, the story "started to evolve into a Cape Fear type of situation". The episode's script was finalized by the writers in December 1999 and Kim Manners was selected as the episode's director.

Casting, directing, and makeup
According to series creator Chris Carter, the episode "was very well cast". Actor Billy Drago was cast as Orell Peattie, a decision that Carter later called "especially lucky". His son, Darren E. Burrows, had previously been cast as Bernard in a sixth-season episode, "Monday." The actor who played Dr. Wieder, James Morrison, was a former cast member of the science fiction series Space: Above and Beyond, and had previously been cast as detective Jim Horn in an episode of Millennium called "Dead Letters". Morrison would later get acclaim as Bill Buchanan on the future Fox series 24. Actress Leah Sanders was a childhood friend of John Shiban who had not been in contact for 20 years. When she was coincidentally cast as a background character, Shiban was reportedly delighted.

Kim Manners found "Theef" was difficult to shoot because the cast and crew had inadequate time to prepare. He explained, "It was kind of a rush thing and we got the script very late. We were totally winging it while we were shooting it". In Manners's opinion, the entire episode only "came together" during post-production editing: "When I looked at the footage, it was like I was looking at somebody else's film. But it cut together real nice and the end result was that 'Theef' turned out to be a decent little episode". Manners later admitted that the episode was his only credit for the series during which he experienced illness. With Manners out for a day due to his sickness, Rob Bowman took over directing duties for a day.

Cheri Montesanto-Medcalf, one of the show's makeup creators, was extremely pleased with Drago's makeup in the episode. She later noted, "I remember Billy Drago was awesome–he looked so creepy after makeup. I just wanted this guy to look super-creepy and disturbing to look at, but real enough that you might be scared if you looked out your window at night and saw him standing there".

Broadcast and reception
"Theef" first aired in the United States on March 12, 2000. This episode earned a Nielsen rating of 7.4, with an 11 share, meaning that roughly 7.4 percent of all television-equipped households, and 11 percent of households watching television, were tuned in to the episode. It was viewed by 11.91 million viewers. The episode aired in the United Kingdom and Ireland on Sky1 on June 18, 2000 and received 0.71 million viewers, making it the third most watched episode that week. Fox promoted the episode with the tagline "Voodoo curse? Tonight, the dark powers of black magic have chosen their next victim... Agent Scully." The episode was nominated and won a 2000 Emmy Award by the Academy of Television Arts & Sciences for Outstanding Makeup for a Series.

Emily VanDerWerff of The A.V. Club awarded the episode a "B+", and called it "the strongest straight-up, non-experimental standalone the season’s had so far," as well as one of "the strongest 'scary' episode since season five." She praised the guest cast—mostly notably Drago and Morrison—and wrote that the writers of the episode were able to successfully make the character deaths in the episode count in a way that moved the audience. VanDerWerff's main criticism of the episode was that it painted Peattie "as a backwoods hick and a rather broad stereotype of one." Tom Kessenich, in his book Examinations, gave the episode a moderately positive review. Despite slightly criticizing the episode utilizing a voodoo-based plot, which he called "[not] terribly original", he concluded that "there's nothing wrong with a little modern medicine vs. practical magic confrontation. And I definitely enjoyed how Scully had her envelope pushed once again". Rich Rosell from Digitally Obsessed awarded the episode 4 out of 5 stars, noting, "writer Vince Gilligan gets fairly serious in this ep concerning a series of deadly hexes cast upon a doctor and his family, as well as some cryptic scrawlings. There's plenty of bad mojo going around as the X-Files team gets to dig deep into the dark side of the magick arts, with Scully at one point losing her sight, thanks to a vengeful hex doll. Spooky".  TV Guide later named the episode's main antagonist, Orell Peattie, as one of "The Scariest X-Files Monsters". Paula Vitaris from Cinefantastique gave the episode a moderately mixed review and awarded it two-and-a-half stars out of four. She concluded that "although 'Theef' is burdened with some illogical plot developments and some underdeveloped characterization, overall it is a decent installment of The X-Files".

Several other reviews were more mixed. Kenneth Silber from Space.com was critical of the episode, noting that the main antagonist is "a veritable caricature of backwoods stupidity and thus hard to take seriously". He did, however, compliment the sympathetic qualities of Dr. Wieder and his family. Robert Shearman and Lars Pearson, in their book Wanting to Believe: A Critical Guide to The X-Files, Millennium & The Lone Gunmen, rated the episode two-and-a-half stars out of five, noting that the episode was "just too unambitious an X-File to be anything more than a collection of moments, only some of which work".

Footnotes

Bibliography

External links 

 

2000 American television episodes
Television episodes set in California
Television episodes written by Vince Gilligan
The X-Files (season 7) episodes
Fiction about Voodoo
Television episodes about euthanasia
Television episodes about magic
Television episodes about revenge
Television episodes about families